Mesodesma is a genus of saltwater clams, marine bivalve mollusks in the family Mesodesmatidae. It is the type genus of the family.

Species
There are numerous species within the genus Mesodesma, including:

 Mesodesma donacium (Lamarck, 1818) colloquially known and eaten as macha in Chile

References

 
Bivalve genera